This is a list of Brazilian television related events from 1963.

Events

Debuts

Television shows

Births
6 February – Cláudia Ohana, actress
4 September – Tatola Godas, presenter brazilian
15 December – Cristiana Oliveira, actress

Deaths

See also
1963 in Brazil